John Frederick Hannah (January 5, 1913 – June 11, 1994) was an American animator, writer and director of animated shorts.

Biography
Hannah was born on January 5, 1913, in Nogales, Arizona. He moved to Los Angeles in 1931 to study at the Art Guild Academy. One of his first jobs was designing movie posters for Hollywood theaters. In 1933, during the Great Depression, Hannah dropped off his portfolio at Walt Disney Studios, and soon afterward was hired as an in-between and clean-up artist, working on Mickey Mouse, Donald Duck, and Silly Symphony cartoons.

Hannah's career as an animator commenced with the short Modern Inventions (released on May 29, 1937). After thirteen films in that capacity, he was assigned to the story department writing cartoon short continuities, beginning with Donald's Nephews (released on April 15, 1938). He received writing credit on 21 Disney cartoon shorts.

In 1942 he collaborated with Carl Barks on the first two comic books Barks worked on, Pluto Saves the Ship and Donald Duck Finds Pirate Gold. Hannah in subsequent years did a handful of other Donald Duck comic book stories but, unlike Barks, he stayed at the studio and eventually was given a chance to be a director. The short Donald's Off Day (released on December 8, 1944) was the first of 94 films he would direct. These include most of the shorts featuring Donald Duck in the post-war era along with all starring Chip 'n Dale and Humphrey the Bear; he also directed some shorts starring Goofy, Mickey Mouse, Pluto and some minor Disney characters such as Lambert the Sheepish Lion.

After Disney stopped producing animated shorts, Hannah did 14 episodes of the Walt Disney anthology television series (composed of footage from the classic cartoons along with new linking material) and fulfilled his ambition to direct live-action by handling Walt Disney's introductions for the episodes. Hannah hoped to segue into a career in live-action but "Walt had me pegged as an animation director so he balked at the suggestion. We had a few heated discussions and I became aware that I had come to an impasse."

Hannah then went to Walter Lantz Productions and directed a number of films featuring Woody Woodpecker and some minor characters. Besides directing shorts, Hannah also was assistant director for the television series The Woody Woodpecker Show, which began airing on October 3, 1957. "I did more or less the same thing that I did with Walt Disney in directing live-action except Lantz was better at taking direction." His last directing effort was the short Charlie's Mother-In-Law (released on April 16, 1963). He retired shortly thereafter.

In 1975, Hannah was one of the co-founders, along with T. Hee, of the Character Animation program at the California Institute of the Arts.

Hannah was honored as a "Disney Legend" in 1992. Jack Hannah is often credited with developing, if not creating, the personality of the animated version of Donald Duck. It is for this reason Disney historian Jim Korkis has dubbed him "Donald Duck's Other Daddy." Despite that, Hannah has often been noted for being responsible for Donald's most formulaic period, where constantly paired Donald with pint-sized antagonists. The most famous of these antagonists are Chip 'n Dale, but other characters included Spike the Bee, Bootle Beetle and a colony of ants. These vermin became the focus of their shorts, relegating Donald to a supporting foil role with a consequent personality diminution.

Hannah died from cancer in Burbank, California on June 11, 1994, at age 81.

Filmography

Films

TV series 
 Disneyland (1954–79)
 The Donald Duck Story (director and story; 1954)
 Adventures of Mickey Mouse (director; 1955)
 At Home with Donald Duck (director; 1956)
 The Great Cat Family (segment director; 1956) 
 Where Do the Stories Come From? (director; 1956)
 On Vacation (director; 1956)
 A Day in the Life of Donald Duck (director;1956)
 Duck for Hire (director; 1957)
 Donald's Award (director; 1957)
 All About Magic  (sequence director; 1957)
 Your Host, Donald Duck (director;1957)
 From All of Us to All of You (director; 1958)
 Four Tales on a Mouse (director: Christmas sequence; 1958) 
 Donald's Weekend (director; 1958)
 Highway to Trouble (director;1959)
 Duck Flies Coop (director; 1959)
 Two Happy Amigos (director;1960)
 This Is Your Life Donald Duck (director;1960)
 Kids Is Kids (segment director; 1961)
 A Square Peg in a Round Hole (segment director; 1963) 
 The Ranger of Brownstone (sequence director; 1968) 
 Baseball Fever (director; 1979)
 The Woody Woodpecker Show (1957–58)
 Matty's Funday Funnies (TV Series) (1962; story)

References

External links

 
Jack Hannah Remembers Pirate Gold at Mouse Planet
Donald Duck's Other Daddy (Part One)
 

1913 births
1994 deaths
Walt Disney Animation Studios people
Animators from Arizona
American male writers
American animated film directors
American film directors
American screenwriters
Animation screenwriters
Burials at Forest Lawn Memorial Park (Hollywood Hills)
California Institute of the Arts faculty
Deaths from cancer in California
People from Nogales, Arizona
Walter Lantz Productions people
20th-century American screenwriters